The Louisiana Mr. Football Award is an honor given to the top high school football player in the state of Louisiana. Past winners have often proceeded to have successful college careers and play in the National Football League (NFL) and other professional football leagues.

Award winners
Professional teams listed are teams known. N/A indicates player is not eligible to play in the NFL yet

References

External links
LSWA - Louisiana Mr. Football award winners 

Mr. Football awards
1993 establishments in Louisiana
Awards established in 1993